Jared Deck is an American politician who has served as the Oklahoma House of Representatives member from the 44th district since November 16, 2022.

Oklahoma House of Representatives
Deck announced his campaign for the Oklahoma House of Representatives to succeed Representative Emily Virgin in June 2021. He defeated former Norman city councillor Kate Bierman in the primary for the Democratic Party's nomination and faced Republican RJ Harris in the general election. He won the general election with over 73% of the vote and was sworn in on November 16, 2022.

References

21st-century American politicians
Living people
Democratic Party members of the Oklahoma House of Representatives
Year of birth missing (living people)